Wissam Baraka (born 13 June 1985) is a Moroccan footballer. He usually plays as a forward for Nahdat Berkane.

See also
Football in Morocco
List of football clubs in Morocco

References

1985 births
Living people
Moroccan footballers
Footballers from Casablanca
Kawkab Marrakech players
Moghreb Tétouan players
Olympique Club de Khouribga players
RS Berkane players
Association football forwards